Patterdale (Saint Patrick's Dale) is a small village and civil parish in the eastern part of the English Lake District in the Eden District of Cumbria, in the traditional county of Westmorland, and the long valley in which they are found, also called the Ullswater Valley. The parish had a population of 460 in 2001, increasing to 501 at the 2011 Census.

The poet William Wordsworth lived in youth near Patterdale and his autobiographical poem The Prelude narrates in Book 1 such childhood activities as fishing in the lake from a stolen boat. The village is now the start point for a number of popular hill-walks, most notably the Striding Edge path up to Helvellyn. Other fells that can be reached from the valley include Place Fell, High Street, Glenridding Dodd, most of the peaks in the Helvellyn range, Fairfield and St Sunday Crag, and Red Screes and Stony Cove Pike at the very end of the valley, standing either side of the Kirkstone Pass which is the road to Ambleside.

Further up the valley to the north is the lake of Ullswater with Gowbarrow Fell and Hallin Fell overlooking it. The only tarn in the valley is Brothers Water, one of the first places in the Lakes to be acquired by the National Trust. The only other village in the valley is Glenridding. Patterdale village has a youth hostel, a church, a primary school and a hotel. In summer it can get quite busy, but not so much as Glenridding. Patterdale is considered to be a walkers' valley, and in fact Alfred Wainwright stated that it was his favourite valley in the Lake District as it is relatively undisturbed by tourism.

Alongside Glenridding, Patterdale was also badly affected by Storm Desmond in December 2015.

Local government
The civil parish of Patterdale also includes the villages of Glenridding and Hartsop. As well as the southern end of Ullswater, it also includes the smaller lake of Brothers Water.

From 1894 to 1934, the parish was part of the West Ward Rural District, then was transferred to the newly created Lakes Urban District, finally becoming part of Eden District in 1974, under the Local Government Act 1972.

Geography
The A592 road, Windermere to Penrith, crosses the southern boundary of the parish at the col of the Kirkstone Pass. The A592 continues north crossing the northern boundary of the parish at Glencoyne Bridge, having covered 7.2 road miles (11.6 km) and 6.7 miles (10.8 km) as the crow flies.

See also
 Listed buildings in Patterdale
 Patterdale Terrier
 Patterdale Mountain Rescue Team

References

External links

 Cumbria County History Trust: Patterdale with Hartsop (nb: provisional research only – see Talk page)
Video and commentary on St Patrick's Holy Well
Patterdale TODAY - village website - what's happening in Hartsop, Deepdale, Patterdale and Glenridding
Village website
Patterdale C of E Primary School website
Patterdale Parish Boundary Walk
Patterdale Village Store and Post Office
Patterdale Dog Day Annual Sheep Dog Trials
Patterdale Hall Adventure Learning Centre
Patterdale War Memorial Information
Patterdale Community Flood Group website

 
Villages in Cumbria
Civil parishes in Cumbria
Eden District